Alain Wicki (*6. July 1962) is a Swiss skeleton racer who competed from the 1980s to the early first decade of the 21st century. He won a complete set of medals in the men's event at the FIBT World Championships with a gold in 1989, a silver in 1998, and a bronze in 1982.

Wicki won the overall men's Skeleton World Cup title in 1988-9. Before his career in skeleton racing, he played several years in the Swiss basketball team as teenager, but never broke through.

References
FIBT men's skeleton results: 1928-2005 (link invalid as of December 6, 2007).
List of men's skeleton World Cup champions since 1987.
Men's skeleton world championship medalists since 1989
Official website
Skeletonsport.info profile

Living people
Swiss male skeleton racers
Year of birth missing (living people)